The Bergmann–Bayard was a German-designed semi-automatic pistol produced under license in Belgium.

Bergmann Mars
The Bergmann Mars was produced in 1901, and was the first Bergmann design aimed squarely at the military market, with a comparatively powerful 9×23mm Bergmann round. It aroused the interest of a number of armies and was the subject of several trials in competition with the Mauser C96, Mannlicher, Browning and Luger pistols.

Model 1903
The Bergmann–Bayard Model 1903  was adopted by the Spanish Army in 1905 as the Pistola Bergmann de 9 mm. modelo 1903. Unable to find a German manufacturer to complete the Spanish order for 3,000 pistols, Theodor Bergmann turned to a Belgian manufacturer, Anciens Etablissements Pieper (who used the trademark "Bayard") who completed the order. The modified pistol was known as the Bergmann Bayard 1908 (not to be confused with Pieper-Bayard 1908), or in Spain as the Pistola Bergmann de 9 mm. modelo 1908. Although adopted in 1908  delivery of the approximately 3,000 weapons was not completed until two years later. Meanwhile, other manufacturers such as Campo-Giro had adopted the 9mm Bergmann–Bayard round and, due to its long history of use in Spanish submachine guns, carbines and pistols, today it is most commonly known as the 9mm Largo.

Model 1910 and Model 1910/21
At the same time, the Bergmann–Bayard model 1910 was adopted by the Danish military. A total of 4,840 M1910 Bergmann Bayards was initially delivered to the Danish Army.  The pistol was produced in Belgium until 1914, when production ceased during World War I and never resumed.  The Bergmann–Bayard was later produced in Denmark from 1922 to 1935.

Several modifications to the original design, such as an improved extractor and bolt; a screw to retain the sideplate instead of a spring-loaded catch; and a new grip design extending the full length of the backstrap to the frame were made. The original grips were made of Trolit, a checkered plastic material similar to Bakelite. It was, however, prone to chipping and warping, and the majority of new 1910/21 models was fitted with checkered wooden grips.

More than 2,200 Danish Bergmann–Bayard pistols were produced in Copenhagen. In addition, most of the prewar M1910s delivered to the Danish army by AEP were converted to meet the new specifications. These were restamped "M1910/21" beneath the Societe Anonyme Anciens Establissments Pieper on the left side of the barrel extension. The last Danish 1910/21 models were built in 1935, but they remained standard issue for the Danish military until 1946 when they were replaced by the Browning Hi-Power.

Other variants
German forces received between 1,000-2,000 modified Model 1910 pistols from the occupied AEP factory. Comparatively speaking these are very rare, and have  distinctive wooden grips fitted and changed markings, but seem to have been mechanically identical.

Greece also adopted the pistol in 1913 (presumably the Model 1910) but no deliveries are believed to have taken place due to the outbreak of war.

Bergmann–Bayard pistols in .45 ACP  were submitted for US army trials in 1906, but were unsuccessful.

Users

  - Supplied by Germany during the Finnish Civil War

See also
 9×23mm Largo
 Astra Model 900
 Mauser C96

References

External links

 The Bergmann-Bayard M1910 Pistol 9mmLargo.com

Semi-automatic pistols 1901–1909
Semi-automatic pistols of Spain
9mm Largo firearms